Patrick Newman (born August 7, 1963) is a Canadian coxswain. He won a gold medal at the 1993 World Rowing Championships in Račice with the lightweight men's eight. At the 1996 Summer Olympics in Atlanta, he came fourth with the Canadian men's eight.

References

1963 births
Canadian male rowers
World Rowing Championships medalists for Canada
Coxswains (rowing)
Rowers at the 1988 Summer Olympics
Rowers at the 1996 Summer Olympics
Olympic rowers of Canada
Living people